Alan Turner may refer to:

Alan Turner (cricketer) (born 1950), former Australian cricketer
Alan Turner (Canadian football) (born 1984), American and Canadian football wide receiver
Alan Turner (Emmerdale), a fictional character on the British soap opera Emmerdale
Alan Turner (singer), a contestant on series 6 of UK X Factor in 2008